Donna Lewis Friess (born January 16, 1943) is an American author and activist for children's rights.

Early life and education
Donna Jean Lewis Friess was born in Los Angeles, California. Her father, Raymond W. Lewis, Jr., was an aerospace designer and her mother, Dorothy Borwick Lewis McIntyre a recreation director. As a child victim of incest at her father's hands, she sought to get away from her father's control as soon as she was able. She attended Santa Monica City College and was awarded an academic scholarship to the University of Southern California, where she received her bachelor's degree in communication.  She moved into the Alpha Gamma Delta house which she states was "the beginning of the rest of [her] life."  She earned her Bachelor of Arts Degree in 1964, then moved to Orange County. 

Friess enrolled in a doctoral program in psychology at the United States International University in San Diego, California, (now Alliant University) and received her doctoral degree of philosophy in psychology in June 1993. Her dissertation was an interview study of the Women Leaders of the Movement to Stop Child Sexual Abuse.

Career
In 1966, Friess began her full-time career as a college professor at Cypress College where she remained for 44 years, until her retirement in December 2010.

In 1989, Friess' sister and niece learned that a four year old family member was being molested by Friess' father. A 15-month-long court trial took place in Santa Monica, California Superior Court, resulting in a guilty verdict. In 1994, Friess participated in Governor Pete Wilson's two-day Crime Summit  and was invited to attend the bill signings of new laws to protect women and children.  One such law was the “Chemical Castration bill,” calling for the legal use of the drug Depo-Provera, on paroled repeat sex offenders in order to decrease their sexual desire. That bill was signed into law on September 17, 1996.

Reporter Lynn Smith of the Los Angeles Times published a comprehensive account of the court trial and the family's abuse which was released as a cover story for the Los Angeles Times Magazine, August 4, 1991.

Friess' autobiography, Cry the Darkness: One Woman's Triumph over the Tragedy of Incest, was released in 1993.  The media interest led to Friess being asked to speak at survivors' events and before mental health organizations.  By 1998, Cry the Darkness had been published in six more languages.

In 2006, Friess was an appointee by California Governor Arnold Schwarzenegger to serve on an advisory council regarding victim sensitive issues for the California Department of Corrections and Rehabilitation. Friess served as the California Co-Chairperson for the successful passage of the first federal victim's rights bill which was signed by President George W. Bush in 2004. Friess has continued to serve on the Justice Department's Office of Victims Affairs Technical Training and Advisory Council since 2004.

Friess was a founding board member for Laura's House, a shelter for victims of domestic violence in California, 1994, and Mothers Against Child Sexual Abuse in 1995. She was a member of the American Coalition Against Child Abuse, One Voice, California Psychological Association, and Child Abuse Listening and Mediation of Santa Barbara. She served on the WomanSage board of directors from 2011 to 2016.

Friess continues to write books, facilitates a Loss of a Loved One Support group, and volunteers as a life coach and speaker for WomanSage.

Awards and honors
Writing awards for Cry the Darkness include: University of Irvine, Friends of the Library Author's Award, 1996, Winner - Indie Excellence Award 2014; and Honorable Mention in Paris International Book Festival, 2014.

Personal life
Friess married Kenneth Friess, who was active in local politics in historic San Juan Capistrano becoming a four term mayor. They had three children.

Publications

Women Leaders of the Movement to Stop Child Sexual Abuse. Campus: Dissertation. 1993.
 Cry the Darkness: One Woman's Triumph over the Tragedy of Incest, Health Communications, FL. 1993.
 Just Between Us: A Guide to Healing. HIH Publishing, 1995. (out of print)
HIH Publishing, CA. 2000.
 Circle of Love: A Guide to Successful Relationships, 3rd Ed., HIH Publishing, CA. 2008
 One Hundred Years of Weesha: Centennial 2010. HIH Publishing, CA. 2010.
 Cherish the Light: One Woman’s Journey from Darkness to Light. (Sequel to Cry the Darkness.) HIH Publishing, CA. 2013.
 The Unraveling of Shelby Forrest. A novel. HIH Publishing, CA 2014.

References

External links 
 

1943 births
Living people
20th-century American writers
American educators
Children's rights activists
People from Los Angeles
20th-century American women writers
21st-century American women